Joshua Eijgenraam (born 18 February 2002) is a Dutch professional footballer who plays as a midfielder for Eredivisie club Excelsior.

Career
Eijgenraam was born in Berkel en Rodenrijs and progressed through the youth teams of hometown team TOGB before moving to the Excelsior academy in 2014. He made his professional debut in the Eerste Divisie appearing as a substitute against Jong AZ at Excelsior's Stadion Woudestein on 20 November 2020.

Following their promotion from the Eerste Divisie at the end of the 2021–22 season, Eijgenraam was given a new contract and an extension until 2025 as a reward for becoming a permanent fixture in the first team. He subsequently made his Eredivisie debut for Excelsior on 12 August 2022 against SC Cambuur at Cambuur Stadion in a 2–0 victory.

References

External links
 

Living people
2002 births
Dutch footballers
TOGB players
Excelsior Rotterdam players
Eredivisie players
Eerste Divisie players
People from Lansingerland
Footballers from South Holland